The Chonchon ( from ) is a mythical bird from Mapuche religion also present in Chilean and southern Argentine folk myth.

Legend

The Chonchon is the magical transformation of a kalku (Mapuche sorcerer). It is said only the most powerful kalkus can aspire to master the secret of becoming this feared creature.

The kalku or sorcerer would carry out the transformation into a Chonchon by an act of will and being anointed by a magical cream in the throat that eases the removal of the head from the rest of the body, with the removed head then becoming the creature.

The Chonchon has the shape of a human head with feathers and talons; its ears, which are extremely large, serve as wings for its flight on moonless nights. Chonchons are supposed to be endowed with all the magic powers of, and can only be seen by, other kalkus, or by wizards that want this power. Sorcerers take the form of the chonchon to better carry out their wicked activities, and the transformation would provide them with other abilities, such as drinking the blood of ill or sleeping people.

Although the fearsome appearance of a chonchon would be invisible to the uninitiated, they would still be able to hear its characteristic cry of "tue tue tue", which is considered to be an extremely ill omen, usually predicting the death of a loved one.

See also
Flying Head
Manananggal
Soucouyant
Tlahuelpuchi
Rokurokubi

References
Constantino Contreras 2000 (in Spanish). Unidad temática y variedad textual: un tópico social en tres relatos orales, Estudios Filológicos, N° 35

External links
 Fantastic Fauna of Chile

Shapeshifting
Legendary birds
Mythological hematophages
Latin American folklore
Mapuche legendary creatures